Ealhstan may refer to

Leofstan, bishop of London in the early tenth century
Eahlstan, bishop of Sherborne in the mid ninth century